Shubra El Kheima, (from ) is the fourth-largest city in Egypt after Cairo, Giza and Alexandria. It is located in the Qalyubia Governorate along the northern edge of the Cairo Governorate. It forms part of the Greater Cairo metropolitan area.

History and demographics
Shubra El Kheima was a village on the Nile where Mohamed Ali built a palace in its vicinity in 1908 as a rural retreat.

During the 20th Century, the area became primarily inhabited by workers and their families, as it became a major industrial hub.

Today, along with the cities of Cairo and Giza, Shubra al-Kheima makes up the contiguous metropolitan area of Greater Cairo. In the 2017 census it was home to 1,161,514 people, divided between two districts comprising five shiakhas (smallest non-administrative census blocks):

 District 1: (hayy awwal): 481,936 people.

District 2 (hayy thani): 679,578 people.

Transportation
Shubra El Kheima is the northern terminus of Line 2 of the Cairo Metro.

Landmarks

Mohamed Ali Pavilion 
Shubra El Kheima hosts the Fountain Pavilion of Mohamed Ali Pasha, built in 1821 as part of a palace complex that no longer exists. He chose an isolated palace or an official residence away from the Citadel in the district called Shubra, the construction of the palace began in 1808 and it was completed in 1821. The Palace of Mohammad Ali or Shubra Palace is distinguished by its style of decoration that mixes between the Islamic style of decoration and the European one.

Gallery

References and Notes

External links

Districts of Greater Cairo
Populated places in Qalyubiyya Governorate
Metropolitan areas of Egypt
Cities in Egypt